Sverre Krogh Sundbø (born 28 July 1981) is a Norwegian television presenter and sports commentator. He is also a former poker player who won the European Poker Championship title in London in 2005. Krogh Sundbø is currently presenting several sports broadcasts both in Norway and abroad, and was recently the studio anchor for the Olympic Games on Eurosport Norway. He has previously presented shows ranging from reality  to travel and game shows.
Krogh Sundbø is the son of singer Hanne Krogh, is married to stylist and media profile Cecilie Krogh., and is the brother of actress Amalie Krogh. In his teenage years, he was a skilled bandy and football player for IF Ready.

References

1981 births
Living people
Norwegian poker players
Sportspeople from Oslo